Phazaca theclata is a moth of the family Uraniidae. It was first described by Achille Guenée in 1858. It is known from Africa south of the Sahara, from Saudi Arabia, as well as from India, Japan, Myanmar, Nepal and Sri Lanka.

Description
Its wingspan is around 17–22 mm. The hindwings of the male have slight tails at veins 4 and 7, and the venation is normal. In males, the antennae and vertex of the head are whitish. Head and thorax violaceous (violet) grey. Abdomen ochreous, except at base. Forewings violaceous grey. A large triangular patch outlined with double brown line on the costa beyond the middle. There is a similar oval spot with darker centre on inner margin. There is a series of marginal fuscous lunules. Hindwings with the basal half violaceous grey, which is darkest at inner margin. The outer half pale ochreous brown, the two areas defined by a rufous and pale line. There is a series of marginal fuscous lunules. Female has same violaceous abdomen and hindwings as the ground colour.

Larva feeds on Verbenaceae species, including Stachytarpheta urticifolia and plants like Adina cordifolia, Burttdavya nyasica, Morinda sp., Randia dumetorum,  Tectona grandis, Paraserianthes falcataria, Coddia rudis and Duranta erecta

References

External links
 Picture of Dirades theclata on Flickr
 A Taxonomic Revision of the Korean Epipleminae
 New and recent records of moth and butterfly species

Uraniidae
Moths of Sub-Saharan Africa
Moths of Madagascar
Moths of the Comoros
Moths of Mauritius
Moths of Seychelles
Moths of Réunion
Taxa named by Achille Guenée
Insects of the Arabian Peninsula